Helen Dowdy was a Broadway actress and singer who played the role of Queenie in the 1946 revival of Kern and Hammerstein's Show Boat (a role originally played by Tess Gardella in 1927). She was born in New York City.

She created the roles of Lily and the Strawberry Woman in George Gershwin's Porgy and Bess — roles she played for nearly twenty years in several productions.  In the 1951 so-called "complete" recording of the opera, she sang both roles as well as that of Maria.

In 1944, Dowdy performed with Katherine Dunham, troupe on tour. Dowdy also appeared on television on the October 17, 1957, episode of Hallmark Hall of Fame as the Stout Angel in a television production of Marc Connelly's Pulitzer Prize-winning play, The Green Pastures.

References

External links

African-American actresses
American musical theatre actresses
People from New York City
Year of birth missing
Possibly living people
American television actresses
20th-century African-American women singers